In algebraic geometry, an étale morphism is a morphism of schemes that is formally étale and locally of finite presentation. This is an algebraic analogue of the notion of a local isomorphism in the complex analytic topology.  They satisfy the hypotheses of the implicit function theorem, but because open sets in the Zariski topology are so large, they are not necessarily local isomorphisms.  Despite this, étale maps retain many of the properties of local analytic isomorphisms, and are useful in defining the algebraic fundamental group and the étale topology.

The word étale is a French adjective, which means "slack", as in "slack tide", or, figuratively, calm, immobile, something left to settle.

Definition 

Let  be a ring homomorphism. This makes  an -algebra.

Let  be a morphism of schemes.  We say that  is étale if and only if it has any of the following equivalent properties:
  is flat and unramified.
  is a smooth morphism and unramified.
  is a smooth morphism of relative dimension zero.
  is a smooth morphism and a locally quasi-finite morphism.
  is locally of finite presentation and is locally a standard étale morphism, that is,
  is locally of finite presentation and is formally étale.
  is locally of finite presentation and is formally étale for maps from local rings, that is:
Let A be a local ring and J be an ideal of A such that . Let z denote the closed point of Z0. Let  and  be morphisms such that . Then there exists a unique Y-morphism  such that .

Assume that  is locally noetherian and f is locally of finite type. Then the following are equivalent:
  is étale.
 f is formally étale for maps of local rings with the following additional properties.  The local ring A may be assumed Artinian.  If m is the maximal ideal of A, then J may be assumed to satisfy .  Finally, the morphism on residue fields  may be assumed to be an isomorphism.

Examples 

Any open immersion is étale because it is locally an isomorphism.

Covering spaces form examples of étale morphisms. For example, if  is an integer invertible in the ring  then

is a degree  étale morphism.

Any  ramified covering  has an unramified locus

which is étale. 

Morphisms

Expanding upon the previous example, suppose that we have a morphism  of smooth complex algebraic varieties. Since  is given by equations, we can interpret it as a map of complex manifolds. By the previous example, having non-zero Jacobian is the same as being étale.

Let  be a dominant morphism of finite type with X, Y locally noetherian, irreducible and Y normal. If f is unramified, then it is étale.

For a field K, any K-algebra A is necessarily flat. Therefore, A is an etale algebra if and only if it is unramified, which is also equivalent to

This characterization of etale K-algebras is a stepping stone in reinterpreting classical Galois theory (see Grothendieck's Galois theory).

Properties 

 Étale morphisms are preserved under composition and base change.
 Étale morphisms are local on the source and on the base. In particular, it is possible to test the property of being étale on open affines .
 The product of a finite family of étale morphisms is étale.
 Given a finite family of morphisms , the disjoint union  is étale if and only if each  is étale.
Then  is étale.
 Quasi-compact étale morphisms are quasi-finite.
 A morphism  is an open immersion if and only if it is étale and radicial.
 If   is étale and surjective, then  (finite or otherwise).

Inverse function theorem
Étale morphisms 
f: X → Y
are the algebraic counterpart of local diffeomorphisms. More precisely, a morphism between smooth varieties is étale at a point iff the differential between the corresponding tangent spaces is an isomorphism. This is in turn precisely the condition needed to ensure that a map between manifolds is a local diffeomorphism, i.e. for any point y ∈ Y, there is an open neighborhood U of x such that the restriction of f to U is a diffeomorphism. This conclusion does not hold in algebraic geometry, because the topology is too coarse. For example, consider the projection f of the parabola 
y = x2
to the y-axis. This morphism is étale at every point except the origin (0, 0), because the differential is given by 2x, which does not vanish at these points.

However, there is no (Zariski-)local inverse of f, just because the square root is not an algebraic map, not being given by polynomials. However, there is a remedy for this situation, using the étale topology. The precise statement is as follows:  if  is étale and finite, then for any point y lying in Y, there is an étale morphism V → Y containing y in its image (V can be thought of as an étale open neighborhood of y), such that when we base change f to V, then  (the first member would be the pre-image of V by f if V were a Zariski open neighborhood) is a finite disjoint union of open subsets isomorphic to V. In other words, étale-locally in Y, the morphism f is a topological finite cover.

For a smooth morphism  of relative dimension n, étale-locally in X and in Y, f is an open immersion into an affine space . This is the étale analogue version of the structure theorem on submersions.

See also 
Purity (algebraic geometry)

References

Bibliography 
 

 
 
 

J. S. Milne (2008). Lectures on Etale Cohomology

Morphisms of schemes